Tuleta may refer to:

 Tuleta, Texas, a town
 Tuleta Hills, Wisconsin, USA, an unincorporated community
 Operation Tuleta, a British police investigation